People's Militia may refer to:

People's Militia (Burkina Faso)
People's Militias (Czechoslovakia)
People's Militia (Ethiopia)
Russian people's militias in Ukraine, now the 1st Army Corps (DNR) and 2nd Army Corps (LNR) of Russia
Ukrainian People's Militsiya
Militia (China)
Narodnoe Opolcheniye, the people's militia of the Soviet Union
Peoples' Militia of Bulgaria, now National Police Service (Bulgaria)
People's Militia of Eritrea, part of Eritrean Defence Forces
People’s Militia of Libya, part of the Armed Forces of the Libyan Arab Jamahiriya

See also
 Militsiya, police forces in the Soviet Union and eastern Europe